Kentarō, Kentaro, Kentarou or Kentaroh (written: , , , , , ,  or ) is a masculine Japanese given name. Notable people with the name include:

DJ Kentaro (born 1982), Japanese DJ, remixer
, Japanese volleyball player
, Japanese football player
, Japanese composer, pianist
, Japanese baseball player
, Japanese football player
, Japanese shogi player
, Japanese football player
, Japanese voice actor
, Japanese football player
, Japanese football player
, Japanese football player
, Japanese swimmer and Olympic medalist
, Japanese comedian, theatre director, manga artist
, Japanese alpine skier
, Japanese manga artist
, Japanese football player
, Japanese runner
, Japanese football player
, Japanese baseball player
, Japanese football player
, Japanese film director
, Japanese model and actor
, Japanese football player
, Japanese composer and conductor, also known as Ken-P 
, Japanese football player
, Japanese football player
, Japanese football player
, Japanese baseball player
, Japanese wrestler
, Japanese football player
, Japanese actor and singer
, Japanese football player
, Japanese volleyball player
, Japanese manga artist
Kentaro Toyama, Japanese computer scientist
, Japanese football player
, Japanese football player
, Japanese manga artist
, Japanese footballer

Fictional characters
Mr. Kentaro Moto, character name of Mr. Moto in a series of films, portrayed him as a detective by Peter Lorre
, character in the Maison Ikkoku series
Kentaro Kyoutani (京谷 賢太郎), a character from Haikyu!! with the position of wing spiker from Aoba Johsai High
, character in the Inubaka: Crazy for Dogs series
Kentaro Saeki, character portrayed by Haruma Miura in the film The Eternal Zero
, character in the anime of the Love Hina series
, character in the Hanebado! series
, character in the Tiger Mask series

Japanese masculine given names